= Lestadae =

Lestadae or Lestadai (Ancient Greek: Ληστάδαι), or Leistadae or Leistadai (Ληιστάδαι), was a town of ancient Greece on the island of Naxos.

Its site is unlocated.
